Mikołaj Sieniawski (1520–1584) was a Polish magnate, military commander, Field Hetman of the Crown in 1562–64 and 1575–76.

References 

 Bartosz Paprocki, Herby rycerstwa polskiego, 1858 r. (Wielkopolska Biblioteka Cyfrowa). 
 J. Czernecki, Brzeżany. Pamiątki i wspomnienia, Lwów, 1905 r.
 K. Kuśmierz, Sieniawa. Założenia rezydencjonalne Sieniawskich, Kraków, 1984 r.

Field Crown Hetmans
1520 births
1584 deaths
Polish soldiers
Mikolaj
Polish people of the Livonian campaign of Stephen Báthory